Bell, Book & Candle is a German musical group consisting of Jana Gross (vocals), Andy Birr (vocals, guitars, drums) and Hendrik Röder (vocals, bass guitar).

Their first album to be released was Read My Sign in 1998. The album spawned a hit single called "Rescue Me" and featured a cover of a Sheryl Crow song, "Destiny".

Birr is the son of Puhdys singer and guitarist Dieter Birr, and Röder is the son of Puhdys keyboardist Peter Meyer.

Albums

Read My Sign (1998)
 Hurry Up
 Read My Sign
 Still Points
 Heyo
 Imagine
 Realize
 Rescue Me
 Dark Side of the Moon
 Bohemian Rhapsody in Blue
 See Ya
 Hear Me
 So Right
 Destiny

Longing (2000)
 Prelude
 Longing
 I've Got No Time
 Silversun
 Some People
 Rising Sun
 Search Me
 Bliss in My Tears - single
 Killer of Today
 Fire And Run - single
 February
 Why
 Baby You Know

The Tube (2002)
 Catch You - single
 Get Out
 From Yesterday
 Watching A Wonder
 Fly Over The Rainbow Sky
 Younger
 In The Witchin' Hour
 No Day But Today
 Back in My Dreams
 I'm Gonna Make You Mine
 Won't You
 The Usual Thing
 You See What I See

Prime Time (2003)
 My Kitchen
 Cheeky Monkey
 Choose Just Me
 Do You Love Me
 On High
 I Find No Sleep
 Think About It
 Runnaway
 Prime Time
 Meaning of My Heart
 Satan's Real
 Tonight
 Change My Mind

Bigger (2005)
 Universe
 I Was Wrong
 Bigger Picture
 Alright Now
 Louise
 Hunting
 I Find No Sleep
 Dusk Begins To Fall
 Run Away
 You Bring Me Summer
 Day And Night
 Louise - Orchestra Version

Wie wir sind (2018)
 Wie wir sind
 Liebeslied
 So nah
 Déjà-vu
 Ich bin wie keine
 Nullpunkt
 So wie du bist
 Woran glauben wir?
 Sieben Seen
 Wartesaal
 Wo willst du hin?
 Durch die Jahre
 Junimond

External links

 

German musical groups